Coming Up is a British television anthology series, broadcast on Channel 4. Each series contains up to eight episodes consisting of single stories by writers and directors with no previous experience or less than two hours previous screentime, who are sourced through a talent scheme of the same name. Each series encompasses a wide range of genres and topics, using a range of both experienced and fresh actors. It was created by Darren Bender who pitched the concept to the head of Channel 4's Independent Film & Video department, who turned it down. When Bender later became Commissioning Editor for NightTime at the channel, he asked the channel's drama department to co-commission it with him. It ran initially as Dogma TV (for two series) from 2000 to 2002 and then from 2003 until 2013 as Coming Up.

Episodes did not generally air in a single time slot or on a particular day, with many episodes broadcasting back to back. The series gathered considerable press attention, with The Independent writing: "Thank goodness for Coming Up... it's a genuinely interesting display of possibilities".

In 2014, the talent scheme which recruited writers and directors for the series was revamped. A single screenplay, extended to ninety minutes, was to be produced using three writers from a pool of six and a single director. This version of the scheme ran for a second year in 2015.

In 2016, the scheme was again revamped, and retitled as 4Stories. It encouraged applications from under-represented talent: women, disabled people, BAME, and people from disadvantaged backgrounds, to work on a series of three inter-connected half-hour films. Notable writers and directors who started with this program include Jack Thorne, Jon Sen, Tom Harper and Yann Demange. The series has also produced the debut writing credits of actor Christian Solimeno, actress Bronagh Taggart and presenter Rick Edwards.

Episodes

Series 1 (2003)

Series 2 (2004)

Series 3 (2005)

Series 4 (2006)

Series 5 (2007)

Series 6 (2008)

Series 7 (2009)

Series 8 (2010)

Series 9 (2011)

Series 10 (2012)

Series 11 (2013)

References

External links
 

2003 British television series debuts
2013 British television series endings
2000s British anthology television series
2010s British anthology television series
2000s British drama television series
2010s British drama television series
Channel 4 television dramas
English-language television shows
Television series by Banijay